The King's Sole Right over the Militia Act 1661 was an Act of the Parliament of England (13 Cha. 2. c. 6), long title "An Act declaring the sole Right of the Militia to be in King and for the present ordering & disposing the same." Following the English Civil War, this act finally declared that the king alone, as head of the state, was in supreme command of the army and navy for the defence of the realm.

The short bill, described as a "temporary Bill for settling the Militia", was rushed through the Commons and Lords on 16 July 1661 after the failure earlier in the session of a more comprehensive bill. A revised version of the failed bill was passed the following year.

The 1661 act was repealed, except for part of the preamble, by the Statute Law Revision Act 1863; and in full by the Statute Law (Repeals) Act 1969.

See also
Prerogative

Sources

'Charles II, 1661: An Act declaring the sole Right of the Militia to be in King and for the present ordering & disposing the same.', Statutes of the Realm: volume 5: 1628-80 (1819), pp. 308–09. URL: http://www.british-history.ac.uk/report.asp?compid=47290. Date accessed: 5 March 2007.
Text of Act (go to (H)) at constitution.org

Citations

1661 in law
1661 in England
Acts of the Parliament of England
Military history of England